Ano Fanari is a mountain village belonging to the Troizinia-Methana municipality in northeastern Peloponnese, Greece. A small acropolis rises above Ano Fanari. It is situated on the old road from Galatas to Agia Eleni and Epidavros.

Historical population

See also
List of settlements in Attica, including the Troizina area

References

External links
https://web.archive.org/web/20060508193815/http://www.koutouzis.gr/ano-fanari.htm
GTP Travel Pages

Troizinia-Methana
Populated places in Islands (regional unit)